Antonio Gandy-Golden (born April 11, 1998) is a former American football wide receiver. He played college football at Liberty and was drafted by the Washington Football Team in the fourth round of the 2020 NFL Draft. Gandy-Golden retired from the NFL after two seasons in order to return to school.

Early years
Gandy-Golden attended Paulding County High School in Dallas, Georgia, where he played wide receiver on the football team. He was a 2-star recruit according to rivals.com. Following high school, Gandy-Golden committed to Liberty University over offers from Elon, Mercer, Murray State, Kennesaw State and Samford.

College career
As a freshman, he recorded 315 receiving yards and three touchdown receptions. In his sophomore season, he led the Big South in receptions and receiving yards, also becoming Liberty's seventh 1,000-yard receiver in program history. 

In his junior season, he recorded 245 receiving yards against New Mexico, breaking the school's record. He was a part of Liberty's victory in the 2019 Cure Bowl, the school's first bowl game and his final college game. He finished his career at Liberty as the only player there to post three connective thousand yard receiving seasons. As a student, he pursued a major in graphic design.

Professional career

Gandy-Golden was selected by the Washington Redskins in the fourth round of the 2020 NFL Draft with the 142nd overall pick. He signed his four-year rookie contract on July 22, 2020. He recorded his first reception for three yards in a Week 2 loss to the Arizona Cardinals. He was placed on injured reserve on October 24, 2020, due to a hamstring injury, and rejoined the active roster on December 26, 2020.

Gandy-Golden was waived on August 31, 2021, but re-signed to the practice squad the following day. He was elevated to the active roster for the game against the New Orleans Saints in Week 5. He was signed to the active roster on October 23. He was waived on January 1, 2022 and re-signed to the practice squad. He signed a reserve/futures contract after the 2021 regular season ended. 

Gandy-Golden announced his retirement in July 2022 with plans to return to school. He was working on switching from wide receiver to tight end that offseason and finished his NFL career recording only one reception for three yards.

Personal life
Gandy-Golden grew up performing gymnastics and juggling, which he attributed to helping him later in football. He has also been noted for having several other talents, such as his ability to solve a Rubik's Cube in under a minute and achieving a perfect game in bowling. He also draws, paints, and plays guitar as a hobby.

Gandy-Golden was diagnosed with COVID-19 in March 2020.

References

External links

Liberty Flames bio

1998 births
Living people
People from Dallas, Georgia
Players of American football from Georgia (U.S. state)
Players of American football from Chicago
American football wide receivers
Liberty Flames football players
Washington Football Team players